Night Light (Swedish: Nattens ljus) is a 1957 Swedish romantic comedy film directed by Lars-Eric Kjellgren and starring Marianne Bengtsson, Lars Ekborg and Gunnar Björnstrand. It was shot at the Råsunda Studios in Stockholm. The film's sets were designed by the art director P.A. Lundgren.

Synopsis
A girl from a small town heads to Stockholm to begin a new life.

Cast
 Marianne Bengtsson as 	Maria Pettersson
 Lars Ekborg as 	Peter
 Gunnar Björnstrand as 	Mr. Purman
 Birger Malmsten as 	Mikael Sjöberg
 Gösta Cederlund as 	Alfred Björk
 Erik Strandmark as Nice Ruffian
 Georg Rydeberg as 	Director
 Gaby Stenberg as 	Ka
 Helge Hagerman as 	Andersson
 Gösta Prüzelius as Pettersson
 Torsten Lilliecrona as 	Policeman
 Renée Björling as Mrs. Wilhelmsson
 Hanny Schedin as 	Mrs. Nilsson
 Sven-Eric Gamble as 	Photographer
 Sten Ardenstam as 	Lundström
 Ivar Wahlgren as 	Mr. Wilhelmsson
 Gösta Jonsson as 	'Toppen'
 Alf Östlund as 	Gentleman Whose Car Is Stolen
 Sven-Axel Carlsson as 	Gentleman at the Dance Restaurant 
 Stig Johanson as Tram Driver
 Gunnar Sjöberg as  Policeman

References

Bibliography 
 Cardullo, Bert. Screening the Stage: Studies in Cinedramatic Art. Peter Lang, 2006.

External links 
 

1957 films
Swedish comedy films
1957 comedy films
1950s Swedish-language films
Films directed by Lars-Eric Kjellgren
Films set in Stockholm
1950s Swedish films